Mateh Kharpeh (also Romanized as Māteh Kharpeh; also known as Māteh Kharbeh) is a village in Chahriq Rural District, Kuhsar District, Salmas County, West Azerbaijan Province, Iran. At the 2006 census, its population was 299, in 54 families.

References 

Populated places in Salmas County